Sir Robert Hall (1909–1994) was a politician of Antigua and Barbuda. Hall was an opponent of the dominant Antigua Labour Party throughout his career. He was politically active mainly during Antigua and Barbuda's time as a West Indies Associated State.

Career 
During the 1960s, Hall led the Antigua and Barbuda Democratic Movement. This very loose political organisation was most significant for the role it allowed Hall to play in the creation of the Progressive Labour Movement (PLM) in 1968. After the party won four by-elections, it became Antigua and Barbuda's first parliamentary opposition party. Hall was the first leader of this party and the first Leader of the Opposition in the state, but he relinquished this role to George Walter before the 1971 general election.

Hall served as Deputy Premier of Antigua during the Progressive Labour Movement government of 1971–76, and during that period he was also the first Minister for Agriculture in the state. Agricultural policy had been divided among several separate civil service bodies during the previous administration. His flagship policy was diversification of agriculture away from the archipelago's heavy dependence on sugar exports, and to increase the cultivation of other crops, such as the pineapple.

Hall assumed the leadership of the Progressive Labour Movement for a second time in time for the 1980 general election, due to the electoral defeat and subsequent imprisonment of his predecessor, George Walter, on false corruption charges relating to PLM economic mismanagement. Though a free man by 1980, Walter had been barred from participating in the election. This oppression diminished the appeal of opposition parties, and Hall left the legislature in 1984, three years after the full independence of Antigua and Barbuda.

Hall died in 1994, and was posthumously knighted by the United Progressive Party government that came to power in 2004. Outside politics, Hall was a planter and farmer, as well as a former civil servant in the field of agriculture. He was a White Antiguan.

References

1909 births
1994 deaths
Progressive Labour Movement politicians
Government ministers of Antigua and Barbuda
Antigua and Barbuda people of British descent